Saint Vincent Passage is a strait in the Caribbean, that separates the Saint Lucia and Saint Vincent.  It is a pathway between Caribbean sea and Atlantic ocean.

See also 
Saint Lucia Channel

References

Straits of the Caribbean
Bodies of water of Saint Lucia
Bodies of water of Saint Vincent and the Grenadines
Saint Lucia–Saint Vincent and the Grenadines border
International straits